Violet Helen Strachan Elton (1889-1969) was an English badminton player. She started playing badminton in India at the age of seven. After joining a club playing at the Territorial Drill Hall in Kensington she started to come to prominence. She won five All England titles. 
She was capped nine times by England between 1924 and 1930. Elton died on March 4, 1969, in Sidmouth.

Medal Record at the All England Badminton Championships

References

English female badminton players
1889 births
1969 deaths